Sanakhemundi (Sl. No.: 130) is a Vidhan Sabha constituency of Ganjam district, Odisha.

This constituency includes Sanakhemundi block and Dharakote block.

Elected Members

Elected members from the Sanakhemundi constituency are:

2019: (130): Ramesh Chandra Jena (Congress)
2014: (130): Nandini Devi (BJD)
2009: (130): Ramesh Chandra Jena (Congress)

2019 Election Result

2014 Election Result
In 2014 election, Biju Janata Dal candidate Nandini Devi defeated Indian National Congress candidate Ramesh Chandra Jena by a margin of 8,222 votes.

Summary of results of the 2009 Election
In 2009 election, Indian National Congress candidate Ramesh Chandra Jena defeated Bharatiya Janata Party candidate Kishore Chandra Singh Deo by a margin of 23,593 votes.

Notes

References

Assembly constituencies of Odisha
Politics of Ganjam district